County routes in Sullivan County, New York, are maintained by the Sullivan County Division of Public Works and signed with the Manual on Uniform Traffic Control Devices-standard yellow-on-blue pentagon route marker. The county highway system comprises roughly 140 routes arranged across the county in groups of nine. For the most part, state routes in Sullivan County are county-maintained and co-signed with county routes. However, the converse is not true; that is, not all county routes overlap state routes for their entire length. Typically, each series consists of county routes along a single roadway, often overlapping with state highways in the process. The lowest numbered route in the system is County Route 11 (CR 11); the highest is CR 183C. Note that routes 160 through 169 do not conform to any style, and coincidentally the 170 through 179 series (with the exception of the spur designated 174A) follows the pre-expressway routing of New York State Route 17 (NY 17).

Sullivan County posted signage of their routes in 1958.

Routes 1–50

Barryville to Claryville (11–19)
The Barryville to Claryville series encompasses routes 11 through 17 and CR 19, the non-suffixed of which form a mostly continuous roadway between the two communities. Most of the routes are concurrent to NY 55, which follows the Barryville–Claryville route from Barryville north to Curry. At Curry, CR 19 splits from NY 55 to access Claryville. The Barryville–Claryville route is interrupted four times by three state-maintained stretches of NY 55 (from CR 13 to CR 14; from CR 16 to CR 17; and from CR 17 to CR 19) and a locally maintained section within the village of Liberty.

Route list

Barryville to Narrowsburg (21–26)
The Barryville to Narrowsburg series encompasses routes 21 through 26. CR 21, CR 22, and CR 23 form a continuous roadway north to an intersection with NY 97 near Narrowsburg, while CR 24 follows two county-maintained sections of NY 52 in the town of Tusten. The remaining routes are assigned to various connectors in the towns of Tusten and Highland.

Route list

Mongaup to Yulan (31–33)
The Mongaup to Yulan series is only CR 31 through CR 33, as routes 34 through 39 do not currently exist within the county. The roadway begins as CR 31 at NY 97 in Mongaup and heads northwest to a junction with CR 21 and CR 22 in Yulan. CR 31 and CR 32 do not directly intersect each other; instead, they are connected by the northernmost portion of CR 41.

Route list

Pond Eddy to Monticello (41–49)
The Pond Eddy to Monticello series is made up of CR 41 through CR 45 and CR 47 through CR 49, including CR 45A. The Pond Eddy–Monticello roadway begins at NY 97 in Pond Eddy and progresses north as CR 41 through CR 45, from south to north, to a terminus at NY 42 south of Monticello. CR 47 is a spur off CR 32 from Eldred to Highland Lake. The route itself does not connect to any other route in the Pond Eddy-Monticello series; however, the unnumbered Mohican Lake Road continues east from the eastern terminus of CR 47 to intersect CR 42 near Glen Spey. The remaining routes are spurs off the main Pond Eddy–Monticello route.

Route list

Routes 51–100

Liberty to Spring Glen (51–59)
The Liberty to Spring Glen series consists of routes 51 through 59. Routes 51 through 55 follow a single roadway across eastern Sullivan County from Liberty to the Ulster County line, with a brief gap between CR 53 and CR 54 in Woodridge. In Ulster County, the road continues as the short CR 80, terminating at US 209 in Spring Glen. CR 59 is a connector between NY 17B and CR 174 near Monticello and does not connect to any other route in the Liberty-Spring Glen series. The remaining routes are connectors in the vicinity of Woodridge.

Route list

New Vernon to Burlingham (61–66)
The New Vernon to Burlingham series consists of routes 61–65. CR 62 (Winterton Road) runs from the Orange County line near New Vernon to the village of Bloomingburg, where it connects to the village-maintained South Road. The road changes names to North Road at Main Street, and county maintenance of the highway resumes at the north village line as CR 61. It heads northeast from the village as Burlingham Road to the Ulster County line. The other four routes in the series are spurs off the primary New Vernon–Burlingham highway.

Route list

Mongaup Valley to Liberty (71–75)
The route from Mongaup Valley to Liberty comprises routes 71 through 75, with routes 71 through 73 serving as the primary roadway between the hamlet of Mongaup Valley and the village of Liberty. CR 74 and CR 75 are spurs leading away from the main route.

Route list

Livingston Manor to Parksville (81–85)
The Livingston Manor–Parksville series comprises routes 81 through 85, which form a discontinuous, circuitous route between the two communities via Catskill Park. Routes 81 through 83 lead east from Livingston Manor to the hamlet of Debruce while CR 84 and CR 85 head northeast from Parksville to the community of Willowemoc. Debruce (CR 83) and Willowemoc (CR 84) are connected by a town road named Willowemoc Road.

Route list

Hankins to Rockland (91–96)
The Hankins to Rockland series extends from the hamlet of Hankins adjacent to the Delaware River to the Delaware County line north of the hamlet of Roscoe. The main route comprises CR 91 through CR 94, with CR 95 and CR 96 serving as spurs off the road. CR 91 and CR 92 connect by way of CR 124 and CR 179.

Route list

Routes 101 and up

Hartwood to Neversink (101–109)
The Hartwood–Neversink series comprises routes 101 through 109 and connects the hamlets of Hartwood and Neversink. The main route utilizes CR 101 through CR 105, with the remaining routes serving as spurs or connectors off the primary path.

Route list

Narrowsburg to Cochecton (111–117)
The Narrowsburg–Cochecton series comprises routes 111 through 117, which collectively form the shape of a backward "C" between the hamlets of Narrowsburg and Cochecton. Routes 111 through 113 follow NY 52 northeast to Fosterdale, from where the road heads west to the Pennsylvania state line at Cochecton via CR 114 (the former Newburgh and Cochecton Turnpike). The remaining routes are spurs off the primary path.

Route list

Hortonville to Roscoe (121–128)
The Hortonville–Roscoe series comprises routes 121 through 128 and connects NY 17B at Hortonville (near Callicoon) to the Quickway at Roscoe. Routes 121 through 124 serve as the main north–south highway between the two points while the other routes are spurs off the primary road near the village of Jeffersonville.

Route list

Hortonville to Basket (131–134)
The Hortonville–Basket series comprises routes 131 to 134. Unlike the other, lower numbered series, routes 131 to 134 only loosely connect the two locations, using parts of other roads to do so. CR 131 and CR 132 run from CR 121 north of Hortonville to NY 97 at Hankins. CR 133 and its spur do not connect to any of the other routes in the series; instead, they serve to connect NY 97 in Callicoon to the Callicoon Bridge over the Delaware River.

Route list

Kauneonga Lake to Morsston (141–149)
The Kauneonga Lake–Morsston series comprises routes 141 through 149. The primary road between the two locations comprises CR 141, CR 143, CR 145, and CR 146, while CR 142 and CR 144 are spurs leading away from the main route. CR 149 is completely isolated from the rest of the series, running from NY 52 in the town of Callicoon to CR 178 at Livingston Manor over what was once NY 284.

Route list

Routes 151–158
Unlike most numerical groupings in Sullivan County, the county routes numbered 151 through 158 do not form a continuous roadway, save for CR 151 and CR 152. However, the routes are all spurs connecting the rest of the route system to the Ulster County line.

Route list

Routes 161–168
Like the 150 series, the county routes numbered from 161 to 168 (161–164, 166, 166A, and 168 in actuality) do not form a series. However, in this case, most of them are not related.

Route list

Roscoe to Bloomingburg (171–179)

The Roscoe to Bloomingburg series is made up of county routes 171 through 176, 178, and 179, plus three spur routes. All eight mainline routes are mostly continuous and collectively extend from the Delaware County line northwest of Roscoe to the Bloomingburg village line just west of the Orange County line. In between, the route serves Liberty, Monticello, and Wurtsboro via locally maintained highways as the county designations end at the village limits. The series parallels the NY 17 expressway for its entire length and also runs along the southern boundary of Catskill Park from Livingston Manor to the Delaware County line.

Most of the eight mainline routes and CR 179A were originally designated as part of NY 17 in 1924. In the vicinity of Wurtsboro, however, NY 17 initially followed modern CR 166. It was realigned between 1935 and 1938 to use what is now CR 172 instead. Construction began in the early 1950s on a new limited-access alignment for NY 17 through Sullivan County. Over the next 10 years, NY 17 was realigned to follow the freeway as new sections of it opened up. By 1962, all of the modern Quickway from Parksville to Bloomingburg was complete and open to traffic. The highway was extended north to Livingston Manor (exit 96) by 1964 and completed through Sullivan County by 1968.

Route list

CR 183 and spurs
CR 183 is assigned to Airport Road, which connects NY 17B and NY 55 to Sullivan County International Airport. The route has three spurs, all located in the vicinity of the airport.

Route list

See also

County routes in New York

References

External links

Empire State Roads – Sullivan County Roads
Talkerbill Sullivan County Roads